Mana Mecchida Madadi is a 1963 Indian Kannada-language film, directed by K. R. Seetharama Sastry and produced by N. B. Vathsalan and N. Ramachandra. The film stars Rajkumar, Udaykumar, K. S. Ashwath and Balakrishna. The film has musical score by Vijaya Bhaskar. The movie was remade in Telugu in 1965 as Visala Hrudayalu.

Plot 
Shrinath is an innocent young man, born and brought up in a village by his grandfather and is unaware of his father's identity.  His grandfather sends him to a rich man Devarajayya in the city to stay in his house and complete his higher education.  There he meets Sumana, Devarajayya's daughter. Both gradually fall in love much to the discontent of Sumana's parents and Shrinath's grandfather.  To prevent Sumana from marrying Shrinath, her father decides to wed her off to his friend Umakanth's son Ramesh who pretends to be a doctor before his parents but fails all his exams. To avoid this matrimonial alliance,  Sumana lies that she is pregnant with Shrinath's child. Her parents unwillingly agree to their marriage but discover the truth right after the marriage is over. Angry at this act by Sumana, her parents cut all the relationships with her. The newly wed couple go to Shrinath's village where his grandfather angry at first, accepts them soon and dies a day later. Unable to find a right job for himself, Shrinath begins to  grow  vegetables in his farm and sell them. Sumana is pregnant and later delivers a baby boy.   Sumana and Shrinath have to face humiliation in her sister, Leela's wedding due to their poverty. This makes Shrinath challenge Sumana's family to never visit them until he earns Rupees One lakh. After an argument with his wife, Umakanth decides to stay with Srikanth who is his own son, but decides not to disclose it to anyone.  As Umakanth had previously helped Shrikanth a few times, the latter agrees to let him stay with them. Upset by the recent developments in the family,  Sumana's mother, Girija is bed-ridden. The doctor suggests Sumana visiting her mother. But Sumana is unable to make it because of the humiliation her husband has faced.  After some twist of events, the identity of Shrinath's father is revealed, Shrinath earns Rupees one lakh, Sumana's mother recovers, her father and sister reconcile with Sumana after realizing that love is more important than money.

Cast

Rajkumar as Srinath
Udaykumar as Devarajayya
K. S. Ashwath as Umakanth, Srinath's father 
Balakrishna
Narasimharaju as Srinath's friend 
Eshwarappa
Kuppuraj
Shivaji
Bhujanga Rao
Basappa
Hanumantha Rao
Y. R. Ashwath Narayan
Leelavathi as Sumana, Srinath's wife
M. Jayashree as Girija
Indiradevi
R. T. Rama
Revathidevi
B. Jaya
Prabha

Soundtrack
The music was composed by Vijaya Bhaskar.

References

External links
 

1963 films
1960s Kannada-language films
Films scored by Vijaya Bhaskar
Films directed by K. R. Seetharama Sastry
Kannada films remade in other languages